The Decatur Public Transit System is the primary provider of mass transportation in Macon County, Illinois. Fourteen main routes, plus one downtown shuttle using replica trolleys, serve the region.

History
After the removal of streetcars from the city in 1936, the private National City Lines ran the area's bus services; in 1971, voters chose in a referendum for the public to take over this duty.
As of 2022, the bus fleet comprised 21 diesel buses and 2 hybrid buses, but DPTS intends to convert all of its buses to battery electric by 2035. In 2022, the system received a $16.84 million grant towards electrification. This will allow four diesel buses to be replaced with hybrids in 2023 and four electric buses to replace diesel buses in 2025 and every two years thereafter. In addition, the grant will fund electrical upgrades, electric charging equipment and solar panels.

Routes

The Decatur Public Transit system (DPTS) operates 15 bus routes and a downtown trolley route on a pulse system with buses departing the downtown Transit Center at 15 and 45 minutes past each hour. Hours of operation are Monday through Friday from 5:30 A.M. to 7:15 P.M. and on Saturday from 6:15 A.M. to 7:15 P.M. Up until 2022, no service was provided on Sunday or on major holidays. Beginning October 9, 2022, Sunday service began as a one year pilot project with buses running from 9 A.M. to 6 P.M.

11 MLK Dr-Meadowlark
12 Airport-Walmart Plaza
21 Monroe-Walmart Plaza
22 St. Mary's
31 West Grand-Ravia Park
32 South Shores
41 East Grand-Richland Community College
51 Jasper
52 West Main-Wyckles Rd
53 Enterprise-Taylor Rd
61 Walter-Hickory Point Mall
62 Oakland-Fairview Plaza
63 Decatur-Fairview Plaza
71 Lost Bridge
Downtown Trolley

Senator Severns Transit Center
The Senator Severns Transit Center, located downtown at 353 E William St, serves as the primary transfer hub for the Decatur Public Transit System. It was constructed in 2002 and includes amenities such as an indoor waiting area, restrooms, and vending machines. Transit users are also able to purchase transit tokens, passes and punch cards. While the transit center was also intended to serve intercity buses, as of 2022, no intercity buses use the facility. Instead intercity buses stop at a Pilot Truck Stop, located at 4030 East Boyd Road on the north side of Decatur.

Fixed Route Ridership

The ridership statistics shown here are of fixed route services only and do not include demand response.

See also
Sangamon Mass Transit District
Champaign-Urbana Mass Transit District

References

External links
 DPTS Official Page

Decatur, Illinois
Bus transportation in Illinois
Transit agencies in Illinois